Get Off is the fourth album by the Canadian band Haywire, released in 1992. It was the band's final album. Haywire supported it with a Canadian tour.

Critical reception

The Calgary Herald wrote that "Haywire opts for some serious '90s sounds ... That means a mix of Van Halenesque rockers and decidedly funky rhythms."

Track listing

Personnel 
 Paul MacAusland – vocals
 David Rashed – keyboards, backing vocals
 Marvin Birt – guitars, backing vocals
 Ronnie Switzer – bass
 Sean Kilbride – drums and percussion

References

External links 
Get Off lyrics

Haywire (band) albums
1992 albums
Attic Records albums